Evan E. Eichler is an investigator at Howard Hughes Medical Institute studying human genome evolution, genome variation and their role in diseases. He is also a Professor of Genome Sciences at the University of Washington School of Medicine, Seattle.

Education
Eichler was educated at the University of Saskatchewan and Baylor College of Medicine where he was awarded his PhD in 1995 for work on the FMR1 gene.

Research
Eichler is considered one of the experts in genome instability studies, segmental duplication and structural variation.

Awards
 Eichler is an elected Fellow of the American Association for the Advancement of Science.
 Eichler received the 2008 Curt Stern Award from the American Society of Human Genetics.
 He was a co-recipient of the 2010 Newcomb Cleveland Prize by the American Association for the Advancement of Science as one of the co-authors of the May 2010 paper in Science on draft sequencing of the Neanderthal genome.
 Eichler is also a member of the National Academy of Sciences.

References

Living people
Members of the United States National Academy of Sciences
Howard Hughes Medical Investigators
Human Genome Project scientists
American geneticists
Fellows of the American Association for the Advancement of Science
University of Washington faculty
Year of birth missing (living people)
Members of the National Academy of Medicine